Danny Leon Thompson (February 1, 1947 – December 10, 1976) was a college and professional baseball player, a major league shortstop from 1970 to 1976. Diagnosed with leukemia in early 1973 at age 26, he played four more seasons in the majors and died ten weeks after his final game.

Baseball career
Born in Wichita, Kansas, Thompson grew up in tiny Capron, Oklahoma, and played college baseball at Oklahoma State University in Stillwater, where he was an All-American.  He was the first pick of the Minnesota Twins in the secondary phase of the 1968 amateur draft.

Thompson broke into the majors with the Twins in 1970 and had his first full season in 1972; he played for them until June 1976, when he and pitcher Bert Blyleven were traded to the Texas Rangers for four others in a six-player deal.

Leukemia
Following a routine pre-season physical the day before his 26th birthday, Thompson was called in for additional tests and diagnosed with granulocytic leukemia in early February 1973, but he continued his major league career for the next four seasons. He was awarded baseball's annual Hutch Award in Seattle following the 1974 season, and batted .270 in 1975, leading all American League shortstops.

Thompson appeared in 98 games in 1976, and went 1-for-3 in his final start for the Rangers on September 29, appropriately at shortstop in Minnesota's Metropolitan Stadium.  In his final game on October 2, less than ten weeks before his death, he was used as a pinch hitter.

Death
Admitted to the Mayo Clinic in Rochester, Minnesota, on November 16, 1976, Thompson underwent spleen surgery on December 3, and died a week later on December 10, 1976, from complications in Rochester's St. Mary's Hospital. Thompson was 29, leaving behind a wife, Jo, and two young daughters, Tracy and Dana. His funeral was attended by hundreds at the high school gymnasium in Burlington, Oklahoma, and he was buried nearby at the cemetery in his hometown of Capron.

Legacy
During the 1977 season, members of the Texas Rangers wore a black armband with the No. 4 on their left uniform sleeve. Examples of this tribute can be seen in the 1978 Topps baseball card set.

An annual golf tournament honoring Thompson is held in August in Sun Valley, Idaho.  The Danny Thompson Memorial Golf Tournament, benefiting leukemia and cancer research, was launched in 1977 by the Hall of Famer Harmon Killebrew (1936–2011), a former teammate with the Twins; and Ralph Harding (1929–2006), a former Idaho congressman. The first edition included former President Gerald Ford, Speaker of the House Tip O'Neill, and Hall of Fame slugger Mickey Mantle. It has donated over $15.6 million since its inception, and is now the "Killebrew-Thompson Memorial Golf Tournament" (KTM). Killebrew disclosed his esophageal cancer in late 2010 and died five months later at age 74.

See also

 List of baseball players who died during their careers

References

External links

Project Baseball 1976: Danny Thompson
Killebrew-Thompson Memorial Golf Tournament - official site
Idaho Mountain Express - Danny Thompson Golf Tournament - 17-Aug-2007
Sun Valley Guide - Danny Thompson Golf Tournament - Summer 2003

All-American college baseball players
People from Woods County, Oklahoma
Major League Baseball infielders
Baseball players from Wichita, Kansas
Baseball players from Oklahoma
Minnesota Twins players
Texas Rangers players
1947 births
1976 deaths
Deaths from cancer in Minnesota
Deaths from leukemia
Oklahoma State Cowboys baseball players